The Mary Mills Mississippi Gulf Coast Invitational was a golf tournament on the LPGA Tour from 1963 to 1964. It was played on the Mississippi Gulf Coast at the Gulf Hills Dude Ranch & Country Club in Ocean Springs, Mississippi in 1963 and at the Broadwater Beach Hotel & Golf Club in Biloxi, Mississippi in 1964. Mississippi native, Mary Mills, served as tournament host.

Winners
1964 Mickey Wright
1963 Kathy Whitworth

References

Former LPGA Tour events
Golf in Mississippi
History of women in Mississippi